In analytical mechanics, generalized coordinates are a set of parameters used to represent the state of a system in a configuration space. These parameters must uniquely define the configuration of the system relative to a reference state. The generalized velocities are the time derivatives of the generalized coordinates of the system. The adjective "generalized" distinguishes these parameters from the traditional use of the term "coordinate" to refer to Cartesian coordinates.

An example of a generalized coordinate would be to describe the position of a pendulum using the angle of the pendulum relative to vertical, rather than by the x and y position of the pendulum.

Although there may be many possible choices for generalized coordinates for a physical system, they are generally selected to simplify calculations, such as the solution of the equations of motion for the system. If the coordinates are independent of one another, the number of independent generalized coordinates is defined by the number of degrees of freedom of the system.

Generalized coordinates are paired with generalized momenta to provide canonical coordinates on phase space.

Constraints and degrees of freedom

Generalized coordinates are usually selected to provide the minimum number of independent coordinates that define the configuration of a system, which simplifies the formulation of Lagrange's equations of motion.  However, it can also occur that a useful set of generalized coordinates may be dependent, which means that they are related by one or more constraint equations.

Holonomic constraints

For a system of  particles in 3D real coordinate space, the position vector of each particle can be written as a 3-tuple in Cartesian coordinates:

Any of the position vectors can be denoted  where  labels the particles. A holonomic constraint is a constraint equation of the form for particle 

which connects all the 3 spatial coordinates of that particle together, so they are not independent. The constraint may change with time, so time  will appear explicitly in the constraint equations. One constraint equation counts as one constraint. If there are  constraints, each has an equation, so there will be  constraint equations. There is not necessarily one constraint equation for each particle, and if there are no constraints on the system then there are no constraint equations.

So far, the configuration of the system is defined by  quantities, but  coordinates can be eliminated, one coordinate from each constraint equation. (In  dimensions, the original configuration would need  coordinates, and the reduction by constraints means ). It is ideal to use the minimum number of coordinates needed to define the configuration of the entire system, while taking advantage of the constraints on the system. These quantities are known as generalized coordinates in this context, denoted . It is convenient to collect them into an -tuple

which is a point in the configuration space of the system. They are all independent of one other, and each is a function of time. Geometrically they can be lengths along straight lines, or arc lengths along curves, or angles; not necessarily Cartesian coordinates or other standard orthogonal coordinates. There is one for each degree of freedom, so the number of generalized coordinates equals the number of degrees of freedom, . A degree of freedom corresponds to one quantity that changes the configuration of the system, for example the angle of a pendulum, or the arc length traversed by a bead along a wire.

If it is possible to find from the constraints as many independent variables as there are degrees of freedom, these can be used as generalized coordinates. The position vector  of particle  is a function of all the  generalized coordinates (and, through them, of time),

and the generalized coordinates can be thought of as parameters associated with the constraint.

(each dot over a quantity indicates one time derivative).

and so generally depends on the generalized velocities and coordinates. Since we are free to specify the initial values of the generalized coordinates and velocities separately, the generalized coordinates  and velocities  can be treated as independent variables.

Non-holonomic constraints

A mechanical system can involve constraints on both the generalized coordinates and their derivatives. Constraints of this type are known as non-holonomic. First-order non-holonomic constraints have the form

An example of such a constraint is a rolling wheel or knife-edge that constrains the direction of the velocity vector. Non-holonomic constraints can also involve next-order derivatives such as generalized accelerations.

Physical quantities in generalized coordinates

Kinetic energy

The total kinetic energy of the system is the energy of the system's motion, defined as

in which · is the dot product. The kinetic energy is a function only of the velocities , not the coordinates  themselves. By contrast an important observation is

which illustrates the kinetic energy is in general a function of the generalized velocities, coordinates, and time if the constraints also vary with time, so .

In the case the constraints on the particles are time-independent, then all partial derivatives with respect to time are zero, and the kinetic energy is a homogeneous function of degree 2 in the generalized velocities.

Still for the time-independent case, this expression is equivalent to taking the line element squared of the trajectory for particle ,

and dividing by the square differential in time, to obtain the velocity squared of particle . Thus for time-independent constraints it is sufficient to know the line element to quickly obtain the kinetic energy of particles and hence the Lagrangian.

It is instructive to see the various cases of polar coordinates in 2D and 3D, owing to their frequent appearance.  In 2D polar coordinates ,

in 3D cylindrical coordinates ,

in 3D spherical coordinates ,

Generalized momentum

The generalized momentum "canonically conjugate to" the coordinate  is defined by

If the Lagrangian  does not depend on some coordinate , then it follows from the Euler–Lagrange equations that the corresponding generalized momentum will be a conserved quantity, because the time derivative is zero implying the momentum is a constant of the motion;

Examples

Bead on a wire

This is a suitable choice of generalized coordinate for the system. The constraint force is the reaction force the wire exerts on the bead to keep it on the wire, and the non-constraint applied force is gravity acting on the bead.

Suppose the wire changes its shape with time, by flexing. Then the constraint equation and position of the particle are respectively

which now both depend on time  due to the changing coordinates as the wire changes its shape. Notice time appears implicitly via the coordinates and explicitly in the constraint equations.

Simple pendulum

The relationship between the use of generalized coordinates and Cartesian coordinates to characterize the movement of a mechanical system can be illustrated by considering the constrained dynamics of a simple pendulum.

A simple pendulum consists of a mass  hanging from a pivot point so that it is constrained to move on a circle of radius . The position of the mass is defined by the coordinate vector  measured in the plane of the circle such that  is in the vertical direction.

This equation also provides a constraint on the velocity components,

Notice that the force of gravity acting on the mass  is formulated in the usual Cartesian coordinates,

where  is the acceleration due to gravity.

The virtual work of gravity on the mass  as it follows the trajectory  is given by

Thus, the virtual work is given by

To complete the analysis consider the kinetic energy  of the mass, using the velocity,

so,

This yields the three equations

Using the parameter , those equations take the form

which becomes,

or

This formulation yields one equation because there is a single parameter and no constraint equation.

Double pendulum

The benefits of generalized coordinates become apparent with the analysis of a double pendulum.  
For the two masses , let  define their two trajectories.  These vectors satisfy the two constraint equations,

and

The formulation of Lagrange's equations for this system yields six equations in the four Cartesian coordinates  and the two Lagrange multipliers  that arise from the two constraint equations.

Now introduce the generalized coordinates  that define the angular position of each mass of the double pendulum from the vertical direction.  In this case, we have

The force of gravity acting on the masses is given by,

where  is the acceleration due to gravity.  Therefore, the virtual work of gravity on the two masses as they follow the trajectories  is given by

The variations  can be computed to be

Thus, the virtual work is given by

and the generalized forces are

Compute the kinetic energy of this system to be

Euler–Lagrange equation yield two equations in the unknown generalized coordinates  given by

and

The use of the generalized coordinates  provides an alternative to the Cartesian formulation of the dynamics of the double pendulum.

Spherical pendulum

For a 3D example, a spherical pendulum with constant length  free to swing in any angular direction subject to gravity, the constraint on the pendulum bob can be stated in the form

where the position of the pendulum bob can be written

The position  is measured along the suspension point to the bob, here treated as a point particle. A logical choice of generalized coordinates to describe the motion are the angles . Only two coordinates are needed instead of three, because the position of the bob can be parameterized by two numbers, and the constraint equation connects the three coordinates  so any one of them is determined from the other two.

Generalized coordinates and virtual work
The principle of virtual work states that if a system is in static equilibrium, the virtual work of the applied forces is zero for all virtual movements of the system from this state, that is,  for any variation .

Let the forces on the system be  be applied to points with Cartesian coordinates , then the virtual work generated by a virtual displacement from the equilibrium position is given by

where  denote the virtual displacements of each point in the body.

Now assume that each  depends on the generalized coordinates  then

and

The  terms

are the generalized forces acting on the system.   Kane shows that these generalized forces can also be formulated in terms of the ratio of time derivatives,

where  is the velocity of the point of application of the force .

In order for the virtual work to be zero for an arbitrary virtual displacement, each of the generalized forces must be zero, that is

See also

Canonical coordinates
Hamiltonian mechanics
Virtual work
Orthogonal coordinates
Curvilinear coordinates
Mass matrix
Stiffness matrix
Generalized forces

Notes

References

Bibliography of cited references

 
Dynamical systems
Rigid bodies